Prisoners in Petticoats is a 1950 American crime film directed by Philip Ford and written by Bradbury Foote. The film stars Valentine Perkins, Robert Rockwell, Danni Sue Nolan, Anthony Caruso, Tony Barrett, and David Wolfe. The film was released on September 18, 1950, by Republic Pictures.

Plot

Mark Hampton from the district attorney's office investigates a shooting outside the nightclub of gangster Nicky Bowman, questioning club pianist Beverly Brent as well. Beverly's real name is Joan Grey but she uses a pseudonym so that the reputation of her father, a college professor, won't be sullied by her association with criminals, including boyfriend Steve London.

A gun moll, Francie White, double-crosses boyfriend Sam Clarke, who is killed while Steve makes off with $100,000 of Sam's from an armored-car heist. When bags are switched, Beverly is unaware that she now has the stolen money. When it is found at the professor's home, Steve is shot by police and Beverly is placed under arrest and sent to prison.

Francie is behind bars for another crime. She persuades Beverly to break out, then betrays her, tipping off Bowman. In the nick of time, Hampton comes to the rescue, having developed a romantic interest in Beverly.

Cast    
Valentine Perkins as Joan Grey, alias Beverly Brent
Robert Rockwell as Mark Hampton
Danni Sue Nolan as Francie White 
Anthony Caruso as Nicky Bowman
Tony Barrett as Steve London
David Wolfe as Sam Clark
Alex Gerry as Prof. Wesley Grey
Michael Carr as Danny
Queenie Smith as Beatrice
Bert Conway as Pete Shock
Marlo Dwyer as Candy Carson
Russ Conway as Detective Blake
Marta Mitrovich as Sadie

References

External links 
 

1950 films
American crime films
1950 crime films
Republic Pictures films
Films directed by Philip Ford
American black-and-white films
1950s English-language films
1950s American films